Sven Evert Gunnarsson (28 December 1929 – 30 November 2022) was a Swedish rower. In his early career he competed in the coxless pair. Together with Bernt Torberntsson he won the 1949 European Championships, but had no success at the 1948 and 1952 Olympics. He then changed to coxed fours and eights and won three silver medals at the 1955 European Championships and 1956 Olympics.

References

1929 births
2022 deaths
Swedish male rowers
Olympic rowers of Sweden
Rowers at the 1948 Summer Olympics
Rowers at the 1952 Summer Olympics
Rowers at the 1956 Summer Olympics
Olympic silver medalists for Sweden
Olympic medalists in rowing
Medalists at the 1956 Summer Olympics
European Rowing Championships medalists
People from Uddevalla Municipality